Longobarditidae is a family of ceratitd ammonoids known from the early Triassic, included in the Danubitaceae.  Longobarditidae includes genera formerly placed in Hungaritidae by the American Treatise on Invertebrate Paleontology, Part L, 1957 as well as genera that have been described since.

Taxonomy
Longobarditidae includes 17 genera, 16 distributed among 4 subfamilies plus one unassigned. Six genera were named prior to the first publication of part L of the Treatise on Invertebrate  Paleontology in 1957, the remaining 11 since. Arctohungerites, Groenlandites, Longobardites, and Noetingites were previously included in the  Hungeritidae, Czekanowskites in the Meekoceritidae, and Pearylandites in the Siberitidae

Fm. Longobarditidae 
 Gen Azarianites
Subfm. Czekanowskitinae
 Gen. Arctohungerites
 Gen.  Czekanowskites
 Gen.  Stannakhites 
 Gen.  Tetsaoceras
Subfm. Groenlanditinae 
 Gen. Groenlandites 
 Gen. Lenotropites 
 Gen. Pearylandites
Subfm. Longobarditinae 
 Gen. Grambergia 
 Gen. Intornites 
 Gen. Longobardites 
 Gen. Longobarditoides
 Gen. Oxylongobardites 
 Gen. Subhungarites 
Subfm. Noetlingitinae 
 Gen. Noetlingites
 Gen. Pronoetlingites
 Gen. Silberlingeria

References

 Classification of E. T. Tozer 1981  
E. T. Tozer. 1981. Triassic Ammonoidea: Classification, evolution and relationship with Permian and Jurassic Forms. The Ammonoidea: The evolution classification, mode of life and geological usefulness of a major fossil group 66-100 
Classification of E. T. Tozer 1994 
E. T. Tozer. 1994. Canadian Triassic Ammonoid Faunas. Geological Survey of Canada Bulletin 467:1-663
Treatise on Invertebrate Paleontology, Part L, Ammonoidea. R. C. Moore (ed) Geol Soc of America and Univ of Kansas  press, 1957.

Danubitaceae
Ceratitida families
Early Triassic first appearances
Early Triassic extinctions